Alphatetraviridae is a family of viruses. Moths and  butterflies serve as natural hosts. There are two genera in the family. Infection outcome varies from unapparent to lethal.

Taxonomy
The following genera are assigned to the family:

Betatetravirus
Omegatetravirus

Structure
Viruses in Alphatetraviridae are non-enveloped, with icosahedral geometries, and T=4 symmetry. The diameter is around 40 nm. Genomes are linear and non-segmented, bipartite, around 6.5kb in length.

Life cycle
Viral replication is cytoplasmic. Entry into the host cell is achieved by penetration into the host cell. Replication follows the positive stranded RNA virus replication model. Positive stranded rna virus transcription is the method of transcription. Translation takes place by leaky scanning, and  ribosomal skipping. Moths and butterflies serve as the natural host. Transmission routes are oral.

References

External links
 Viralzone: Alphatetraviridae
 ICTV

 
Virus families
Riboviria